The city of Seattle, Washington, United States, has multiple bridges that are significant due to their function, historical status, or engineering. Bridges are needed to cross the city's waterways and hilly topography. Twelve bridges have been granted historical status by the city, federal government, or both. Seattle also has some of the only permanent floating pontoon bridges in the world.

Original crossings over Seattle's mudflats were typically supported by timber piles. Lake Washington and Puget Sound are to the east and west of the city, respectively. They connect via a series of canals and Lake Union that are collectively known as the Lake Washington Ship Canal. The four double-leaf bascule bridges crossing the Ship Canal are the oldest still used in the city, having opened between 1917 and 1930.  The easternmost—the Montlake and University bridges—connect neighborhoods south of the canal to the University District. The Fremont Bridge crosses the center of the canal and is one of the most often raised drawbridges in the world due to its clearance over the water of only .  The westernmost crossing of the ship canal is the Ballard Bridge.

Floating bridges carry Interstate 90 and State Route 520 across Lake Washington to the Eastside suburbs. The SR 520 Albert D. Rosellini Evergreen Point Floating Bridge, which opened in 2016 as the replacement for another floating bridge at the same site, is the longest floating bridge in the world. The Lacey V. Murrow Memorial Bridge had previously been replaced after the original span sunk in 1990 when water filled an open maintenance hatch during refurbishing. Age and the 2001 Nisqually earthquake have damaged the several other spans. The risk of future earthquakes has increased the need to replace already deteriorated bridges in the city, such as the Alaskan Way Viaduct (removal began in January 2019) and the Magnolia Bridge.

West Seattle is on a peninsula separated from downtown by the Duwamish River. The West Seattle Bridge is the primary roadway crossing the river. The neighborhood's Spokane Street Bridge is the world's first and only hydraulically operated concrete double-leaf swing bridge.

List of bridges

Demolished or defunct bridges

See also
 
 
 

 List of bridges on the National Register of Historic Places in Washington (state)
 List of Seattle landmarks
 South Park Bridge, just outside the city limits
 East Channel Bridge, connects the Interstate 90 bridges with the Eastside suburbs via Mercer Island
 Tacoma Narrows Bridge, a pair of suspension bridges in nearby Tacoma
 Wilburton Trestle, a historic wooden railway trestle in nearby Bellevue

Notes

References

Seattle
Seattle
Bridges, Seattle
Bridges
Bridges
Transportation buildings and structures in Seattle
Bridges